Riggs Lennon (born May 26, 1994) is an American retired soccer player who played as a forward.

College and amateur
Lennon played college soccer at the University of Virginia from 2013 to 2015, transferring to Creighton University in 2016 for his senior year.

Lennon also appeared for Premier Development League side Lane United FC in 2016.

Club career
Lennon signed with United Soccer League side Real Monarchs on April 29, 2017.

Lennon signed with Tulsa Roughnecks FC on December 19, 2017.

Personal life
Riggs' brother is fellow soccer player Brooks Lennon, who plays for Atlanta United.

References

External links
 

1994 births
Living people
American soccer players
Soccer players from Arizona
Sportspeople from the Phoenix metropolitan area
People from Paradise Valley, Arizona
Association football forwards
Virginia Cavaliers men's soccer players
Creighton Bluejays men's soccer players
Lane United FC players
Real Monarchs players
FC Tulsa players
Cleveland SC players
USL Championship players
USL League Two players